The 1979 Intercontinental Cup was an association football final played on a two-legged system. It was the last time in the history of the tournament that this format was used before Toyota became the main sponsor in 1980 and a single-game final was held each year in Japan. The final was played between Olimpia Asunción of Paraguay (winners of the 1979 Copa Libertadores) and Malmö FF of Sweden (runners-up of the 1978–79 European Cup), with Olimpia emerging as the champion after a 3–1 aggregate score win. Malmö FF took its place as the runners-up of the European competition since the European champions Nottingham Forest declined to play the final.


Match details

First leg

|valign="top" width="50%"|

|}

Second leg

|valign="top" width="50%"|

|}

See also
1979 Copa Libertadores
1978–79 European Cup
Malmö FF in European football

References

External links
1979 Intercontinental Cup at RSSSF by Osvaldo José Gorgazzi

1979 in South American football
1979 in Swedish football
1979–80 in European football
1980 in Paraguayan football
1980 in South American football
1980 in Swedish football
Club Olimpia matches
1979
International club association football competitions hosted by Sweden
International association football competitions hosted by Paraguay
Malmö FF matches
1979 in Paraguayan football
November 1979 sports events in Europe
March 1980 sports events in Europe
1979 Intercontinental Cup
International sports competitions in Malmö
Sports competitions in Asunción
1979 Intercontinental Cup